Žamenci is a small village in the Municipality of Dornava in northeastern Slovenia. It lies in the foothills of the Slovene Hills on the left bank of the Pesnica River just east of Dornava. The area is part of the traditional region of Styria. It is now included with the rest of the municipality in the Drava Statistical Region.

References

External links
Žamenci on Geopedia

Populated places in the Municipality of Dornava